Breed 77 (pronounced "Breed Seven-Seven") is a Gibraltarian rock band. The band was formed in 1996 and perform a combination of alternative metal, rock, and flamenco.

Origin
Breed 77 comes from the British overseas territory of Gibraltar. Old Gibraltarian school friends Paul Isola, Danny Felice, and Stuart Cavilla met up in London and became informally known as the Gibraltarian Mafia. When, in late April 1996, this circle of friends formed a band, they wanted a name to reflect their joint origins and called themselves simply Breed. The band were forced to change their name because it was previously registered by Steve Hewitt (formerly of Placebo) on his vanity record label. Stuart Cavilla, the band's bass player, had previously worked as a motorcycle courier under the call sign of Kilo 77 or K77, and the band became Breed 77.

Awards
In 1998, Kerrang! readers voted Breed 77 the 'Best Unsigned Band'. In 1999, they won both the Metal Hammer and Kerrang! awards for the best new band. Then in 2001 they signed a five-album deal with Albert Productions, the renowned Australian publisher of AC/DC.

Music releases
In November 2009, the band self-released their fifth studio album, Insects. This was followed by a re-release of the album in 2010 by German label EarMusic, and the release of a Spanish language version of the album in mainland Europe. 

In March 2013, the band released its sixth studio album "The Evil Inside". through Frostbyte Records, following a successful PledgeMusic campaign and the release of 2012 acoustic EP Under The Skin.  The first music video from the album, titled "Bring On the Rain", was released on the band's website on 6 March 2013.

The band headlined a UK tour in September 2010, joined by the Defiled and Transgression. The tour was called 'Infesting Britain'.

On 28 August 2013, lead vocalist Paul Isola announced his departure from the band due to personal circumstances, detailing that he would not be participating in the band's upcoming summer tour. He revealed that his replacement would be Rui Lopez, who would be completing the lineup for the four dates and joining the band thereafter.

Following this, it was announced in early 2014 that Paul Isola was to rejoin the band for a newly announced 10th Anniversary tour for the album Cultura. 

After the success of the first anniversary tour in March 2014, a second leg was announced taking in further venues across the UK, culminating in the band's final tour performance at The Exchange in Bristol in December 2014. 

In 2015 it was announced that the band would headline Breaking Bands Festival in Bromsgrove that summer. 

Prior to the show there had been no public announcement that this was to signify the break-up or indefinite hiatus of the band, and cryptic statements by the band on stage left many fans confused as to their future. 

Over the following years, the activity of the band as a whole was largely unknown. 

Vocalist Paul Isola returned to his homeland of Gibraltar, forming a multi-media production company. 

Guitarist Danny Felice and bassist Stuart Cavilla relaunched their project The Heretic Order, recording a number of EPs and albums and touring across Europe. 

Guitarist Pedro Caparros López began working on a new project titled L’Anima and performed a number of tour dates across the UK as well as recording and releasing new material. 

Drummer Andre Joyzi carried on working in a number of positions in the music industry, firstly continuing to run a number of music venues in London, and then going on to work as a drum tech and tour manager for a number of artists across the world including Dragonforce and Cradle Of Filth. 

In 2017, after much radio silence and comments on the bands social media pages that the band was ‘done’, they were announced to headline the Gibraltar National Day Festival that September. 

The one-off concert - which saw the return of original bassist Stuart Cavilla and former drummer Óscar Preciado Zamora - drew a massive crowd, filling Casemates Square and was broadcast live on Gibraltar TV and streamed online across the world.

A number of years silence from the band followed, with members continuing to work on their separate projects; occasionally sharing updates about their respective projects on Breed 77’s social media channels. 

After the Coronavirus pandemic in early 2020, vocalist Paul Isola returned to the public eye for the first time in almost 3 years, performing a livestream of a number of songs as part of the Gibraltar Live At Home sessions. 

In the months that followed, guitarist Danny Felice also featured in the program, fuelling speculation that the band would shortly be reuniting. 

In early 2021 increased activity was noticed on the band’s Facebook page, with cryptic videos appearing and the launch of an Instagram account for the band. 

After a 48 hour countdown, on 10 February 2021 the band released a new music video and recording - recorded remotely by the band members - of an acoustic version of the bands 2004 track A Matter Of Time. 

A statement from the band accompanied the release of the video, signifying that Breed 77 had decided to ‘awaken from their slumber’ and that new music and a number of multi-media releases were on the horizon. 

Whilst the statement said that the band may not be able to perform live together with an audience at the current time, it is implied that plans are on the cards for a tour in future. 

As of February 2021, the full lineup of the reunited band has not been confirmed publicly, however it is thought based on the music video released that the band will consist of vocalist Paul Isola and guitarists Danny Felice and Pedro Caparros López with any other members currently unknown.

Members

Current lineup
 Paul Isola (Gibraltar) lead vocals, (1996–2013, 2014–2015, 2017, 2021-)
 Danny Felice (Gibraltar) – guitars, backing vocals (1996–2015, 2017, 2021-)
 Pedro Caparros López (Barcelona, Spain) – guitars, backing vocals (2002–2015, 2017, 2021-)

Former members
 Lawrence Bautista – drums (1996–1997)
 Nick Beesley – drums (1997–1998)
 Charlie Gomez – bass (1999–2000)
 Dan Wilkinson – bass (2000)
 Peter Chichone – drums and other percussion (1998–2006)
 Adam Lewis – drums and other percussion (2006–2007)
 Óscar Preciado Zamora  – drums and other percussion (2007–2010, 2017 (one-off))
 Rui Lopez (Lisbon, Portugal) – lead vocals (2013–2014)
 Ben Edis (Nottingham, England) – bass (2014–2015)
 Andre Joyzi (Lisbon, Portugal) – drums and percussion (2010–2015)
Stuart Cavilla – bass (1996–1999, 2001–2014, 2017)

Timeline

Discography

Studio albums

Singles

EPs
 The Message (1998)
 Vol. 1 (1999)
 La Ultima Hora (2003)
 Shadows (2005)
 Under the Skin (2012)

Music videos
 "Karma" (2001)
 "La Última Hora" (2003)
 "The River" (2004)
 "World's on Fire" (2005)
 "Shadows" (2005)
 "Blind" (2006)
 "El Mundo en Llamas" (2008)
 "El Rio" (2008)
 "Wake Up" (2009)
 "Zombie" (2010)
 "Bring On the Rain" (2013)
 "Fear" (2013)
 "A Matter Of Time (Acoustic)" (2021)

References

External links
Breed 77 official website (archived)
Facebook page

 
British alternative metal musical groups
Musical groups established in 1996
Musical groups disestablished in 2018
Gibraltarian musical groups